Eva Rueda (born 13 September 1971) is a Spanish artistic gymnast, born in Madrid. She competed at the 1988 Summer Olympics, and the 1992 Summer Olympics.

Eponymous skill 
Rueda has one eponymous balance beam skill listed in the Code of Points.

References

External links

1971 births
Living people
Gymnasts from Madrid
Spanish female artistic gymnasts
Olympic gymnasts of Spain
Gymnasts at the 1988 Summer Olympics
Gymnasts at the 1992 Summer Olympics
Originators of elements in artistic gymnastics
20th-century Spanish women